The Guernsey Festival  was a pop music/rock music festival held at The Rabbit Warren in the parish of Saint Sampson, Guernsey. The first festival took place 2–3 July 2011. The second festival took place on the weekend of 23–24 June 2012. On 5 January, the organisers announced that the Guernsey Festival 2013 was on hold.

Organisation

The Guernsey Festival has been organised by brothers Jon and Paul Stephen  since its inception in 2011.

Guernsey Festival 2011 - 2–3 July 2011

See also
Music of the Channel Islands

References

External links
The official Guernsey Festival website

Channel Online TV

Music festivals in Europe
Festivals in Guernsey
2011 establishments in Guernsey
Music festivals in Guernsey
Rock festivals in Guernsey
Electronic music festivals in Guernsey
Music festivals established in 2011